Iberville is a provincial electoral district in the Montérégie region of the province of Quebec, Canada. It is located south of Montreal. It includes part of the city of Saint-Jean-sur-Richelieu, as well as Marieville, Saint-Césaire and Mont Saint-Grégoire.

It was created for the 1867 election, and an electoral district of that name existed earlier in the Legislative Assembly of the Province of Canada.

It was named after former New France explorer Pierre Le Moyne d'Iberville.

The city of Saint-Pie was lost to the Saint-Hyacinthe district in the 2011 electoral map, updated from the 2001 map.

Since the 1980s, three Iberville MNAs have crossed the floor:

 Yvon Lafrance, elected liberal (1989) becomes in 1994 the first ADQ sitting in history
 André Riedl, elected adéquiste (2007) joins the liberal government in 2008
 Claire Samson, elected in 2014 and 2018 as a member of the CAQ, in 2021 joins the Conservative Party of Quebec, and becomes its first sitting member in the national assembly.

Note: Manitoba also has a provincial electoral district named Iberville, and there was also a federal Iberville electoral district.

Members of the Legislative Assembly / National Assembly

Election results

|}

|}

^ Change is from redistributed results. CAQ change is from ADQ.

|-
 
|Liberal
|Andre Riedl
|align="right"|9,075
|align="right"|32.01
|align="right"|

|-

|}

References

External links
Information
 Elections Quebec

Election results
 Election results (National Assembly)
 Election results (Elections Quebec)

Maps
 2011 map (PDF)
 2001 map (Flash)
2001–2011 changes  (Flash)
1992–2001 changes  (Flash)
 Electoral map of Montérégie region
 Quebec electoral map, 2011

Iberville
Saint-Jean-sur-Richelieu